Charles Edward Graves (December 22, 1849 – August 5, 1928) was an American politician who served in the Virginia House of Delegates.

References

External links 

1849 births
1928 deaths
Democratic Party members of the Virginia House of Delegates
19th-century American politicians